Edwin Bramwell FRSE PRCPE LLD (1873–1952) was a 20th-century Scottish neurologist. He was President of the Royal College of Physicians of Edinburgh from 1933 to 1935.

Life

He was born in North Shields on 11 January 1873 the son of Martha (née Crighton) and Sir Byrom Bramwell. He was educated at Cheltenham College. He then studied medicine at the University of Edinburgh graduating MB ChB in 1896.

After graduation he began working at the Edinburgh Royal Infirmary then moved to the National Hospital for the Paralysed and Epileptic in London. He then did a years further postgraduate study in Freiburg in Germany. In 1900 he settled in Edinburgh as a consultant and in 1902 moved to work in Leith Hospital as Assistant Physician. In 1907 he returned to Edinburgh Royal Infirmary as Assistant Physician.

In 1906 he was elected a Fellow of the Royal Society of Edinburgh. His proposers were Daniel John Cunningham, John Chiene, George Chrystal and Alexander Bruce. At this time he lived at 24 Walker Street in Edinburgh's West End.

In the First World War he served in the 2nd Second General Hospital treating the returning wounded. He began to specialise in brain injuries and mental injuries such as shell shock and in 1919 began lecturing in Neurology at the University of Edinburgh. In 1922 he became Professor of Clinical Medicine. In 1927 he was elected a member of the Aesculapian Club.

He died in Edinburgh on 21 March 1952. He is buried in Dean Cemetery. The grave lies on the westmost outer wall of the first northern extension.

Publications
A keen fly-fisher, he wrote many articles for the Fishing Gazette under the pseudonym "The Professor".

Family

In 1908 he married Elizabeth Cumming Cunningham (1879-1960) daughter of Daniel John Cunningham and granddaughter of Very Rev John Cunningham. They had four daughters and two sons. One daughter Margaret Claire Byrom Bramwell married Dr James Kirkwood Slater.

His brother was Byrom Stanley Bramwell.

References

1873 births
1952 deaths
People educated at Cheltenham College
Alumni of the University of Edinburgh
Academics of the University of Edinburgh
British neurologists
Presidents of the Royal College of Physicians of Edinburgh
Fellows of the Royal Society of Edinburgh
Burials at the Dean Cemetery